Ouro Sogui or Ourossogui lies in Matam Region in eastern Senegal on the N2 and N3 roads, just south west of Matam on the River Senegal.  It is an important market town and transport hub.

In the census of 2002, Ourossogui had 13,177 inhabitants. In 2007, according to official estimates, it had grown to 15,614.

Populated places in Matam Region
Communes of Senegal